The 2001 WNBA Season was the Women's National Basketball Association's fifth season. The season ended with the Los Angeles Sparks winning their first WNBA championship.

Regular season standings
Eastern Conference

Western Conference

Season award winners

Playoffs

Coaches

Eastern Conference
Charlotte Sting: Anne Donovan
Cleveland Rockers: Dan Hughes
Detroit Shock: Greg Williams
Indiana Fever: Nell Fortner
Miami Sol: Ron Rothstein
New York Liberty: Richie Adubato
Orlando Miracle: Carolyn Peck
Washington Mystics: Tom Maher

Western Conference
Houston Comets: Van Chancellor
Los Angeles Sparks: Michael Cooper
Minnesota Lynx: Brian Agler
Phoenix Mercury: Cynthia Cooper
Portland Fire: Linda Hargrove
Sacramento Monarchs: Maura McHugh
Seattle Storm: Lin Dunn
Utah Starzz: Fred Williams and Candi Harvey

External links
2001 WNBA Awards
2001 WNBA Playoffs

 
2001
2001 in American women's basketball
2000–01 in American basketball by league
2001–02 in American basketball by league